Asclepias subulata is a species of milkweed known commonly as the rush milkweed, desert milkweed  or ajamete. This is an erect perennial herb which loses its leaves early in the season and stands as a cluster of naked stalks. Atop the stems are inflorescences of distinctive flowers. Each cream-white flower has a reflexed corolla that reveals the inner parts, a network of five shiny columns, each topped with a tiny hook. The fruit is a pouchlike follicle that contains many flat, oval seeds with long, silky hairlike plumes. This milkweed is native to the desert southwest of the United States and northern Mexico.

Researchers in Bard, California tested the plant as a potential source of natural rubber in 1935.

Asclepias subulata is a larval host for the monarch butterfly.

References

External links
Jepson Manual Treatment for Asclepias subulata
Asclepias subulata — UC Photo gallery

subulata
North American desert flora
Flora of the California desert regions
Flora of the Sonoran Deserts
Flora of Arizona
Flora of Nevada
Natural history of the Colorado Desert
Natural history of the Mojave Desert
Rubber
Flora without expected TNC conservation status
Taxa named by Joseph Decaisne